Hans-Uwe Bauer (born 26 August 1955) is a German actor. He appeared in more than ninety films since 1979.

Filmography

Film

References

External links 

1955 births
Living people
German male film actors